The Alfstarz was a dansband in the town of Ronneby, Sweden.

Discography

Singles
Jag är på väg/Vem - 1988
Barfota i regn/Amors pilar (Little Arrows) - 1989
San Martinique/Ge inte upp - 1989
Bang en boomerang/Tack för ni kom (Dein Herz wird mich versteh'n) - 1991

Svensktoppen songs
Natten tänder ljus på himlen - 1986-1987

References

Dansbands
Swedish musical groups